The Super League World Nines (known as the Gatorade Super League World Nines due to sponsorship), was a pre-season rugby league nines tournament between national sides. Set up in the midst of the Super League war and created in opposition to the Australian Rugby League's World Sevens tournament, the tournament was held twice before being abandoned when the two factions merged to form the National Rugby League.

History

1996  Super League World Nines Tournament
The 1996 World Nines were held at National Stadium in Suva, Fiji from 22 February to 24 February. The winner of this competition was New Zealand, who won their first world trophy in a rugby league competition. New Zealand were awarded A$30,000 for the win. 

The 1996 World Nines marked the first time that a video referee was used for a game of Rugby League or Rugby Union . Due to a court ruling in the Federal Court of Australia, this was the only Super League competition held in 1996.

1997 Tournament
The 1997 World Nines were held in Townsville, Queensland from 31 January to 2 February. New Zealand won this competition for the second year in a row.

Squads

1996 Tournament.
All teams were selected as professional playing squads. 

Sixteen squads competed in Suva: - Ireland played in a warm up test V's Australia at the Fiji National Stadium in the week leading up to the World Nines. 14 February 1996. Australia winning 22:12. 

John Kirwan (New Zealand) won a Rugby Union World Cup Winners Medal with the All Blacks in the 1st ever Rugby World Cup 1987. Kirwan would go on to Coach both Italy and Japan National Rugby Union Teams 

Henry Paul (New Zealand) would represent ~ Bath, Gloucester and England in Rugby Union. 

Gary Connolly, of England, and Martin Hall, the Welsh captain, were forced to withdraw from their respective squads after being threatened with legal action by the Australian Rugby League.

*Gary Connolly would go on to transfer to play for Munster Rugby Union 1998 - Ireland. 

Scott Quinnell, Allan Bateman (Wales) would both return to Rugby Union and play for the British & Irish Lions in the winning series v's South Africa.

Iestyn Harris (Wales) would represent Wales in Rugby Union.

Andy Farrell (England) went on the represent England in Rugby Union, and to coach England and later Ireland in Rugby Union

Georgie Graham (Scotland) would represent Scotland in Rugby Union

1997 Tournament
Twelve squads of fourteen players competed in Townsville:

Finals

See also
NRL Auckland Nines

References

External links

Super League
Recurring sporting events established in 1996
1997 in Australian rugby league
1996 in Fijian sport
1996 in rugby league
1997 in rugby league
International rugby league competitions hosted by Australia
Rugby league nines